This is a summary of 1955 in music of all genres in the United Kingdom.

Events
2 January – Michael Tippett's 50th birthday is celebrated in a concert held at Morley College, in which Benjamin Britten and Peter Pears perform.
27 January – Premiere of Michael Tippett's opera The Midsummer Marriage at the Royal Opera House, Covent Garden in London, conducted by John Pritchard, with designs by Barbara Hepworth and choreography by John Cranko; it arouses controversy.
May – The Ivor Novello Awards are launched.
4 May – The bass-baritone Peter Dawson records Albert Arlen's song Clancy of the Overflow (to Banjo Paterson's poem) with the London Symphony Orchestra conducted by Charles Mackerras. It is 73-year-old Dawson's last recording.
11 May – Arthur Bliss's Violin Concerto receives its first performance in London.
8 June – Pearl Carr & Teddy Johnson marry.
July – Steuart Wilson, a retired singer and musical administrator, launches an outspoken campaign against "homosexuality in British music", saying: "The influence of perverts in the world of music has grown beyond all measure. If it is not curbed soon, Covent Garden and other precious musical heritages could suffer irreparable harm."
29 November – Juan José Castro conducts the UK premiere of Carlos Chávez's Third Symphony at the Maida Vale Studios with the London Symphony Orchestra.
Late November – Lonnie Donegan's 1954 skiffle recording of Rock Island Line is released: it becomes a major hit in 1956.
December – The Temperance Seven is founded as a jazz band, initially comprising three members from the Chelsea School of Art in London.
8 December – Sir Thomas Beecham is presented with the Order of the White Rose of Finland.
13 December – Sir Arthur Bliss's orchestral Meditations on a Theme by John Blow is premiered in Birmingham Town Hall.

Charts
See UK No.1 Hits of 1955

Classical music: new works
Malcolm Arnold – Tam O'Shanter Overture
Arthur Bliss – Violin Concerto
Eric Coates – Dambusters March
Peter Maxwell Davies – Trumpet Sonata
Gerald Finzi – Cello Concerto
Michael Tippett – Sonata for Four Horns
Ernst Toch – Symphony No. 3
Ralph Vaughan Williams – Symphony No. 8
William Walton – Johannesburg Festival Overture

Opera
William Alwyn – Farewell Companions (for radio)
Thea Musgrave – The Abbot of Drimock
Michael Tippett – The Midsummer Marriage

Film and Incidental music
John Addison – The Cockleshell Heroes, starring Trevor Howard
Malcolm Arnold – The Deep Blue Sea, starring Vivien Leigh and Kenneth More
Francis Chagrin – The Colditz Story directed by Guy Hamilton, starring John Mills and Eric Portman
Eric Coates – The Dam Busters, starring Michael Redgrave
Benjamin Frankel – The End of the Affair, starring Deborah Kerr, Van Johnson, Peter Cushing and John Mills
William Walton – Richard III directed by and starring Laurence Olivier

Musical theatre
 19 December – Cranks, a revue by John Cranko with music by John Addison, opens at the New Watergate Theatre, London.
Wild Thyme, with music by Donald Swann and lyrics by Philip Guard, starring Betty Paul and Denis Quilley

Musical films
King's Rhapsody, starring Anna Neagle
Oh... Rosalinda!!, starring Anton Walbrook

Births
3 January – Helen O'Hara, vocalist
4 January – Mark Hollis, singer-songwriter 
19 January 
Tony Mansfield, singer-songwriter and producer (New Musik)
 Sir Simon Rattle, conductor
25 January – Terry Chimes, drummer (The Clash)
23 February – Howard Jones, singer-songwriter 
27 February – Peter Christopherson, musician, songwriter, and director (died 2010)
19 March – Paul Edwards, composer of choral music
5 April – Janice Long, radio disc jockey
9 April – Bob Chilcott, choral composer, conductor, and singer
10 April – Lesley Garrett, operatic soprano
17 April – Pete Shelley, guitarist and vocalist (Buzzcocks)
16 May – Hazel O'Connor, singer
22 May – Jerry Dammers, ska musician and songwriter
30 May – Topper Headon (The Clash)
26 June – Mick Jones, English singer-songwriter and guitarist (The Clash, Big Audio Dynamite, General Public, Carbon/Silicon, and London SS)
18 July – Terry Chambers, English drummer (XTC and Dragon)
20 July – Jem Finer, English banjo player and songwriter (The Pogues)
30 July – Christopher Warren-Green, violinist and conductor
30 August – Andy Pask, English bass player and composer
1 September – Bruce Foxton, guitarist (The Jam)
3 September – Steve Jones, guitarist (Sex Pistols)
14 September – William Jackson, harpist and composer
30 September – Frankie Kennedy, folk musician (died 1994)
2 October – Philip Oakey, singer-songwriter 
12 November – Les McKeown, singer (Bay City Rollers) (died 2021)
17 November – Peter Cox, English singer-songwriter (Go West)
30 November – Billy Idol, singer
6 December – Edward Tudor-Pole, singer and TV presenter
15 December – Paul Simonon, bassist (The Clash)
31 December – Tom Morton, musician, broadcaster and writer

Deaths
10 January – Annette Mills, partner of "Muffin the Mule", 60
9 March – Louie René, singer and actress, 83
12 April – W. H. Anderson, composer, 72
4 July – Ruth Vincent, operatic soprano, 78
13 August – Florence Easton, soprano, 72
14 October – Harry Parr-Davies, composer and songwriter, 41 (perforated ulcer)
30 October – Harry Dean, British-born Canadian conductor, pianist, organist and music educator, 76
14 November – Carl Denton, Yorkshire-born American conductor, 80
21 December – Gladys Ripley, operatic contralto, 47

See also 
 1955 in British television
 1955 in the United Kingdom
 List of British films of 1955

References

Sources

 
British Music, 1955 In
British music by year